The Vintage Sports Car Club of America (VSCCA) is an American auto racing club and sanctioning body focused on competition and sports cars made before 1959. It was founded in 1958 and currently runs a year-round schedule of track, hillclimb, rally, and social events primarily on the East Coast.

External links 
VSCCA

Automobile associations in the United States